Adipicola pelagica is a species of saltwater clam, a marine bivalve mollusc in the family Mytilidae, the mussels. It is a deepwater species and is found attached to the bones and tissues of whales that have died and sunk to the seabed, and sometimes to fragments of decomposing carcases which have sloughed off and floated to the surface.

History
In 1854, a small bivalve mollusc was found attached to some whale blubber found floating off the coast of South Africa. The mollusc was passed to the British malacologist Samuel Pickworth Woodward, who determined that the mollusc was new to science, and formally described it, naming the new species Adipicola pelagica.

Description

Distribution and habitat
All the sightings of this mussel have been from the Atlantic Ocean, and in 1987, the New Zealand malacologist Richard Dell concluded that the mussel's range probably extended from the Azores to South Africa. Some of the mussels had been found attached to pieces of floating tissue that broke away from decomposing carcases and rose to the surface, and these may have drifted away from the species' normal distributional range.

References

Mytilidae
Molluscs of the Atlantic Ocean
Bivalves described in 1854
Taxa named by Edward Forbes